Opéra Industriel is a short film produced by Pacific Data Images in 1986. Parts of the film have been used in compilations such as Beyond the Mind's Eye and State of the Art of Computer Animation. The film portrays a number of humanoid, expressionless robots in a monochrome scene that resembles a factory or a forge.

External links

1986 films
1986 short films
Canadian animated short films
French-language Canadian films
1980s English-language films
1980s Canadian films